The Battle of London is a 15-minute British propaganda film made in 1941. It chronicles the impact on the capital city of the winter bombing campaign from 7 September 1940 to 10 May 1941 which German historians consider to be the second phase of the Battle of Britain and which both contemporary parlance and subsequent British historians have always called the Blitz.

The first scenes are of a quiet, peaceful London, apparently before the battle, which quickly progress to the first spate of bombings that the city endured and the spirit of resilience in which Londoners pulled together in various ways to keep the city going.

The film ends with the cry "London can take it, and London can give it too!"

External links 
Complete film at Movieflix

1941 films
British World War II propaganda shorts
Battle of Britain films
British black-and-white films